Francisco Ximénez de Tejada y Eslava (Aragonese: Francisco Ximénes de Texada i Eslava; 13 October 1703, Funes, Kingdom of Navarre − 9 November 1775, Naples) was a Spanish knight who served as the 69th Prince and Grand Master of the Order of Malta from 1773 to 1775. During his reign the Order became unpopular mainly due to bankruptcy brought by the lavish lifestyle of his predecessor Manuel Pinto da Fonseca. His reign was marked by the unsuccessful Rising of the Priests.

During the reign of Ximénez, a warehouse was added to the Salina Right Redoubt in Salina Bay, and the redoubt became known as Ximenes Redoubt due to the large escutcheon with the Grand Master's coat of arms above the doorway.

Death 
Ximénez died of a pulmonary infection on 9 November 1775 while he was in Naples.  Unlike most other Grand Masters of the Order of Malta he had not set aside any money for his funeral. He was buried in a lead-lined wooden coffin in the crypt at Saint John's Co-Cathedral, Valletta, but his tomb remained unmarked. His remains were discovered again in 2021 when arrangements were made for Grand Master Matthew Festing to be buried in the same crypt.

References

Further reading
 Peter Fava, "A Reign of Austerity: Economic Difficulties During the Rule of Grand Master Ximenes (1773-1775)", Storja (1978): 42-59.

 Cynthia De Giorgio, Curator, "Fra` Matthew Festing and the case of Grand Master Francisco Ximénez de Texada (1773-1775)".

External links
Portraits of Grandmaster Fra Francisco Ximénes
Coins for Grandmaster Francisco Ximénes

Grand Masters of the Knights Hospitaller
18th-century Spanish people
1703 births
1775 deaths
Burials at Saint John's Co-Cathedral